Steven Francis Cantwell (born August 12, 1986) is a retired American mixed martial artist. A professional competitor from 2005 until 2012, he competed for the UFC and for the UFC's sister organization, World Extreme Cagefighting. There, Cantwell was a one-time WEC Light Heavyweight Champion and he was the last man to hold the title before WEC's Light Heavyweight division was migrated into the UFC.

Background
Cantwell was born in Long Beach, California and moved to Pahrump, Nevada at the age of 10. After being expelled middle school and high school because of fighting, Cantwell began training in kickboxing at the age of 16, under the tutelage of Nick Blumgren at One Kick's Gym.

Mixed martial arts career

World Extreme Cagefighting
After acquiring a 3–0 record in smaller shows, Cantwell made his WEC debut at WEC 26: Condit vs. Alessio in 2007 against Brian Stann, where he suffered a quick TKO loss. After two subsequent victories, Cantwell again faced Stann, WEC Light Heavyweight Champion at WEC 35 and won by TKO in the second round. Shortly after Cantwell took the title, the WEC dropped both its Light Heavyweight and Middleweight divisions, making Cantwell the final WEC Light Heavyweight Champion.

Ultimate Fighting Championship
Later that year, Cantwell signed with the UFC, which is owned by the WEC's parent company Zuffa. Cantwell faced fellow UFC newcomer Razak Al-Hassan at UFC: Fight for the Troops an earned a technical submission victory by dislocating Al-Hassan's elbow in an armbar, causing referee Mario Yamasaki to stop the fight. Cantwell's celebration of the victory and post-fight comments sparked some criticism when he said, "I've been waiting so long to do that, you have no idea". He later apologized for his behavior.

He fought Luiz Cané at UFC 97, but lost the fight via unanimous decision.

Cantwell would next face Brian Stann at UFC Fight Night 13 in what would be their third fight. In their previous fight Cantwell had defeated Stann to become the last reigning WEC Light Heavyweight Champion. Cantwell lost the rubber match via unanimous decision.

Cantwell was expected to face Vladimir Matyushenko on January 2, 2010 at UFC 108, but pulled out of the bout for undisclosed reasons.  Since there was no time to find a suitable replacement to face Matyushenko, the bout was called off. UFC President Dana White mentioned at the UFC 108 Pre-Fight Press Conference that Cantwell may never fight again, but refused to disclose what Cantwell's medical issues were.

With the questions surrounding his medical condition apparently cleared, Cantwell was expected to face UFC newcomer Ricardo Romero on July 3, 2010 at UFC 116. However, for unknown reasons, Cantwell was replaced by Seth Petruzelli.

Cantwell was expected to face Stanislav Nedkov on October 16, 2010 at UFC 120.  However less than 48 hours before the event, Cantwell was forced off the card after suffering a knee injury during a pre-fight workout.  With no time to find a suitable opponent for Nedkov, the bout was cancelled.

Cantwell faced Cyrille Diabaté on March 3, 2011 at UFC Live: Sanchez vs. Kampmann and lost the fight via unanimous decision.

Cantwell dropped to Middleweight for his next fight and faced Mike Massenzio on October 8, 2011 at UFC 136.  He lost the fight via unanimous decision.

Cantwell faced Riki Fukuda on February 26, 2012 at UFC 144. He lost the fight via unanimous decision and was subsequently released from the promotion.

Championships and Accomplishments
 World Extreme Cagefighting
 WEC Light Heavyweight Championship (One time; final)
 Ultimate Fighting Championship
 Submission of the Night (One time) vs. Razak Al-Hassan

Mixed martial arts record

|-
| Loss
| align=center| 7–6
| Riki Fukuda
| Decision (unanimous)
| UFC 144
| 
| align=center| 3
| align=center| 5:00
| Saitama, Japan
| 
|-
| Loss
| align=center| 7–5
| Mike Massenzio
| Decision (unanimous)
| UFC 136
| 
| align=center| 3
| align=center| 5:00
| Houston, Texas, United States
| 
|-
| Loss
| align=center| 7–4
| Cyrille Diabaté
| Decision (unanimous)
| UFC Live: Sanchez vs. Kampmann
| 
| align=center| 3
| align=center| 5:00
| Louisville, Kentucky, United States
| 
|-
| Loss
| align=center| 7–3
| Brian Stann
| Decision (unanimous)
| UFC Fight Night: Diaz vs. Guillard
| 
| align=center| 3
| align=center| 5:00
| Oklahoma City, Oklahoma, United States
| 
|-
| Loss
| align=center| 7–2
| Luiz Cané
| Decision (unanimous)
| UFC 97
| 
| align=center| 3
| align=center| 5:00
| Montreal, Quebec, Canada
| 
|-
| Win
| align=center| 7–1
| Razak Al-Hassan
| Technical submission (armbar)
| UFC: Fight for the Troops
| 
| align=center| 1
| align=center| 4:04
| Fayetteville, North Carolina, United States
| 
|-
| Win
| align=center| 6–1
| Brian Stann
| TKO (punches)
| WEC 35: Condit vs. Miura
| 
| align=center| 2
| align=center| 4:01
| Las Vegas, Nevada, United States
| 
|-
| Win
| align=center| 5–1
| Tim McKenzie
| Submission (rear-naked choke)
| WEC 33: Marshall vs. Stann
| 
| align=center| 1
| align=center| 2:13
| Las Vegas, Nevada, United States
| 
|-
| Win
| align=center| 4–1
| Justin McElfresh
| TKO (punches)
| WEC 29
| 
| align=center| 1
| align=center| 0:47
| Las Vegas, Nevada, United States
| 
|-
| Loss
| align=center| 3–1
| Brian Stann
| TKO (punches)
| WEC 26: Condit vs. Alessio
| 
| align=center| 1
| align=center| 0:41
| Las Vegas, Nevada, United States
| 
|-
| Win
| align=center| 3–0
| Leonardo Pecanha
| TKO (doctor stoppage)
| Jungle Fight Europe
| 
| align=center| 3
| align=center| 2:32
| Ljubljana, Slovenia
| 
|-
| Win
| align=center| 2–0
| Mike Ashford
| Submission (armbar)
| RITC 78: Back with a Vengeance
| 
| align=center| 1
| align=center| 2:01
| Glendale, Arizona, United States
| 
|-
| Win
| align=center| 1–0
| Richie Hightower
| Submission (armbar)
| RITC 68: Hello Glendale!
| 
| align=center| 1
| align=center| 2:45
| Glendale, Arizona, United States
|

References

External links 

1986 births
Living people
American male mixed martial artists
Mixed martial artists from California
Middleweight mixed martial artists
Light heavyweight mixed martial artists
Mixed martial artists utilizing kickboxing
Mixed martial artists utilizing Brazilian jiu-jitsu
World Extreme Cagefighting champions
Ultimate Fighting Championship male fighters
American practitioners of Brazilian jiu-jitsu
People awarded a black belt in Brazilian jiu-jitsu
People from Long Beach, California
People from Pahrump, Nevada